The Daimler DR450 is a limousine variant of the Majestic Major DQ450 saloon.  Produced from 1961 to 1968, it was the last complete car designed by The Daimler Company Limited.

Intended for the carriage trade, as an executive express or as a hire car for those needing something larger than a five-seater saloon, the DR450 was produced in numbers close to those of the Majestic Major saloon on which it was based.

Design and specifications
The chassis was  longer than for the Majestic Major and the necessarily flat glass of the three side-windows no longer could be let flow with the body-shape. The equally flat-windowed but bulbous Jaguar Mark X was released to the market the same year. The 4,561 cc (278 cubic inch) hemi-head engine pushed the 2¼ tonnes of car and driver to 100 km/h in under 11 seconds, to 100 mph in 37 seconds and provided a top speed of 183 km/h (114 miles per hour), rather better than the much shorter lighter 5-passenger Jaguar Mark X.
 chassis: massive box-section and cross-braced frame, separate from the all-steel body
 suspension
front: Girling type with semi-trailing wishbones and forward facing arms, coil springs, Girling telescopic dampers
rear: live axle, half-elliptic leaf springs, Girling telescopic dampers
 brakes:Dunlop disc brakes vacuum-servo assisted
front: 
rear: 
 wheels:  pressed steel, 5 studs, rims—
 tyres: Dunlop RS5, 700-16 with tubes
 steering: Hydrosteer power assisted
 steering wheel diameter 
 steering column: adjustable for reach
 headlamps two 50/40 watts and fog lamps
 heating and ventilation are independently provided for rear and front compartments
 seating, three on the front bench seat, three on the back seat and two on the folding occasional seats
 folding occasional seats have received particular care in shaping for comfort and support. They fold away into their own footwells below the division when not required
 rear doors open a full 90 degrees
 seatbelts no provision
 grease: ten points every 1,000 miles, seven points every 5,000 miles

Test
Autocar road testers said "Few cars possess the Jekyll and Hyde personality of the Daimler limousine in providing very high performance, comfort, safety and enormous carrying capacity . . . after enjoying the Daimler for its special merits of high performance and excellent handling, one feels even a little sympathy for chauffeurs who may rarely have the opportunity to discover for themselves the other side of the car's character."

The Daimler limousine has achieved a very high standard in this respect".

Performance
On test by Autocar average fuel consumption for the total distance of 1404 miles proved to be 14.7 miles per gallon or 19.2 L/100 km. The maximum speed of the car was a (mean) of 113.5 mph, 182.6 km/h and the best run 114 or 183.2 km/h.

Price
October 1961 £3,995 including tax,Jaguar Mark X £2,393

Market sector 1966
There were only three English limousines in production in 1966.  The Rolls-Royce Phantom V was available for approximately £10,700, the Daimler DR450 for £3,558 complete (or £1,899 for a bare chassis), and the Vanden Plas Austin Princess for around £3,100.

References

DR450
Cars introduced in 1961
Luxury vehicles
Limousines
Rear-wheel-drive vehicles